Ashleigh Aaron Lynch (born 28 April 1990) is an English cricketer.  Lynch is a right-handed batsman who bowls right-arm Fast.  He was born in Burton upon Trent, Staffordshire and was educated at John Port School. In his later years, he has suffered from hair loss which seemed to knock his confidence on and off the field.

While studying for his degree at Loughborough University, Lynch made his first-class debut for Loughborough UCCE against Leicestershire in 2009.  He made two further first-class appearances in 2009, against Kent and Hampshire.  In his three first-class matches, he scored 150 runs at an average of 50.00, with a high score of 100*.

References

External links
Ashleigh Lynch at ESPNcricinfo
Ashleigh Lynch at CricketArchive

1990 births
Living people
Sportspeople from Burton upon Trent
Alumni of Loughborough University
English cricketers
Loughborough MCCU cricketers